Radomir Petković (born November 26, 1986) is a Serbian professional wrestler and former amateur wrestler. He is best known for his time in WWE, in their developmental territory NXT as King Konstantine.

Amateur wrestling career

Petković won two bronze medals in Greco-Roman and Freestyle wrestling at the 2009 Mediterranean Games in Pescara, Italy. He became European vice-champion at the 2010 European Wrestling Championships in Baku, Azerbaijan.

Professional wrestling career

WWE

NXT (2015–2016)
On April 13, 2015, it was announced that Petković had signed a developmental contract with WWE and begun training to become a professional wrestler at the WWE Performance Center in Orlando, Florida. On December 3, 2015, he had his first professional wrestling match in a NXT House Show as King Konstantine. On August 18, 2016, it was announced that Petković had been released from his WWE contract.

References

1986 births
Living people
21st-century professional wrestlers
Serbian male sport wrestlers
Sportspeople from Belgrade
Mediterranean Games bronze medalists for Serbia
Competitors at the 2005 Mediterranean Games
Competitors at the 2009 Mediterranean Games
Mediterranean Games medalists in wrestling
Expatriate professional wrestlers
European Rowing Championships medalists
20th-century Serbian people
21st-century Serbian people